Borecznica  is a village in the administrative district of Gmina Wielgomłyny, within Radomsko County, Łódź Voivodeship, in central Poland.

The population of this region is less than 100 people and primarily is primarily a farming community.

References

Borecznica